Chiesa di Santa Maria Assunta (Italian for Church of Santa Maria Assunta)  is a  Romanesque church in Bominaco, Province of L'Aquila (Abruzzo).

History

Architecture

See also
Catholic Church in Spain

References

External links

Maria Assunta Bonamico
Maria Assunta
Bominaco